Wolfgang Hahn (April 30, 1911 – January 10, 1998) was a German mathematician who worked on special functions, in particular orthogonal polynomials.

He introduced Hahn polynomials, Hahn difference, Hahn q-addition (or  Jackson-Hahn-Cigler q-addition), and the Hahn–Exton q-Bessel function. He was an honorary member of the Austrian Mathematical Society.

References

External links

Pictures of Wolfgang Hahn from Oberwolfach

1911 births
1998 deaths
Academic staff of the Technical University of Braunschweig
20th-century German mathematicians
Q-analogs